The men's 10 miles walk race was held at the 1908 Summer Olympics in London. This was the only time the event was held. The competition was held on Thursday, July 16, 1908, and on Friday, July 17, 1908. The competition was held in two rounds.  There were two heats in the first round, with the top four in each heat advancing to the final. 25 race walkers from eight nations competed. NOCs could enter up to 12 athletes.

Results

First round

The first round heats were held on Thursday, July 16, 1908.

Heat 1

Carter, Larner, and Spencer intentionally drew even to finish in a line. Carter had been in second place, followed by Spencer and then Larner before they did so.

Heat 2

Final
The final was held on Friday, July 17, 1908.

References

Sources
 Official Report of the Games of the IV Olympiad (1908).
 De Wael, Herman. Herman's Full Olympians: "Athletics 1908". Accessed 31 March 2006.

Athletics at the 1908 Summer Olympics
Racewalking at the Olympics